In mathematics, especially in linear algebra and matrix theory, the commutation matrix is used for transforming the vectorized form of a matrix into the vectorized form of its transpose. Specifically, the commutation matrix K(m,n) is the nm × mn matrix which, for any m × n matrix A, transforms vec(A) into vec(AT):
K(m,n) vec(A) = vec(AT) .
Here vec(A) is the mn × 1 column vector obtain by stacking the columns of A on top of one another:

where A = [Ai,j]. In other words, vec(A) is the vector obtained by vectorizing A in column-major order. Similarly, vec(AT) is the vector obtaining by vectorizing A in row-major order.

In the context of quantum information theory, the commutation matrix is sometimes referred to as the swap matrix or swap operator

Properties

 The commutation matrix is a special type of permutation matrix, and is therefore orthogonal.

 Replacing A with AT in the definition of the commutation matrix shows that   Therefore in the special case of m = n the commutation matrix is an involution and symmetric.

 The main use of the commutation matrix, and the source of its name, is to commute the Kronecker product: for every m × n matrix A and every r × q matrix B,

This property is often used in developing the higher order statistics of Wishart covariance matrices.

 The case of n=q=1 for the above equation states that for any column vectors v,w of sizes m,r respectively,

This property is the reason that this matrix is referred to as the "swap operator" in the context of quantum information theory.

 Two explicit forms for the commutation matrix are as follows: if er,j denotes the j-th canonical vector of dimension r (i.e. the vector with 1 in the j-th coordinate and 0 elsewhere) then 

 The commutation matrix may be expressed as the following block matrix:

Where the p,q entry of n x m block-matrix Ki,j is given by 

For example,

Code

For both square and rectangular matrices of m rows and n columns, the commutation matrix can be generated by the code below.

Python

import numpy as np

def comm_mat(m, n):
    # determine permutation applied by K
    w = np.arange(m * n).reshape((m, n), order="F").T.ravel(order="F")

    # apply this permutation to the rows (i.e. to each column) of identity matrix and return result
    return np.eye(m * n)[w, :]

Alternatively, a version without imports:

# Kronecker delta
def delta(i, j):
    return int(i == j)

def comm_mat(m, n):
    # determine permutation applied by K
    v = [m * j + i for i in range(m) for j in range(n)]

    # apply this permutation to the rows (i.e. to each column) of identity matrix
    I = [[delta(i, j) for j in range(m * n)] for i in range(m * n)]
    return [I[i] for i in v]

MATLAB
function P = com_mat(m, n)

% determine permutation applied by K
A = reshape(1:m*n, m, n);
v = reshape(A', 1, []);

% apply this permutation to the rows (i.e. to each column) of identity matrix
P = eye(m*n);
P = P(v,:);

Example

Let  denote the following  matrix:

 has the following column-major and row-major vectorizations (respectively):

The associated commutation matrix is 

(where each  denotes a zero). As expected, the following holds:

References

 Jan R. Magnus and Heinz Neudecker (1988), Matrix Differential Calculus with Applications in Statistics and Econometrics, Wiley.

Linear algebra
Matrices
Articles with example Python (programming language) code
Articles with example MATLAB/Octave code